First American Financial Corporation is an American financial services company which provides title insurance and settlement services to the real estate and mortgage industries.

The First American Family of Companies’ core business lines include title insurance and closing/settlement services; title plant management services; title and other real property records and images; valuation products and services; home warranty products; property and casualty insurance; and banking, trust and investment advisory services.
With total revenue of $5.8 billion in 2017, the company offers its products and services directly and through agents.

In June 2010, First American Financial Corporation was established when First American split its businesses to create First American Financial Corporation which provides title and settlement services to the real estate and mortgage industry, and CoreLogic, specializing in real estate information.

Orange County Title Company (1889–1960)

First American traces its roots to 1889, when Orange County, California—a rural, undeveloped area at the time—split off from the county of Los Angeles. Two firms opened to handle title matters in the brand-new county. Five years later, Charles Edward Parker (C.E. Parker), a local businessman, succeeded in merging the two competitors into a single entity—Orange County Title Company. C.E. Parker became the president of Orange County Title, which, starting in 1909, would pay a cash dividend every year for the rest of the century and would become one of the first abstract companies in California to qualify to issue title insurance policies.

Donald Parker Kennedy (D.P. Kennedy), grandson of C.E. Parker, joined Orange County Title in 1948. D.P. Kennedy developed a plan to expand the company beyond Orange County, which was approved by the board of directors in 1957.

First American Title Insurance and Trust Company (1960–1968)

Orange County Title was renamed First American Title Insurance in 1960 to reflect operations beyond Orange County,

D.P. Kennedy was named president of First American Title in 1963, replacing his uncle, George Parker.  First American Title had its initial public offering on the over-the-counter market in 1964 and, four years later, was restructured with the formation of The First American Financial Corporation as a holding company. First American Title became a subsidiary company and a trust business was conducted through First American Trust Company.

The First American Financial Corporation(1968–2000)

 First American expanded its title operations across the nation by opening new offices and acquiring existing title and abstract companies. 
 In 1976, this growth lead to an expansion of the company's Santa Ana headquarters.
 By 1982, First American served all regions of the United States.
 In 1988, First American began to operate internationally with the opening of title insurance offices in Canada.
 First American continued to develop international operations and was the first title insurance provider in Mexico, Korea and Hong Kong, and had the leading market share in Australia and England.

The First American Corporation (2000–2010)

The First American Financial Corporation was renamed The First American Corporation in May 2000 to reflect the expansion of services beyond financial services and title insurance. 
The First American Family of Companies grew to operate within five business segments, including: Title Insurance and Services, Specialty Insurance, Mortgage Information, Property Information, and Risk Mitigation and Business Solutions. First American had approximately 2,100 offices throughout the United States and abroad.

First American Financial Corporation (2010–present)

In June 2010, The First American Corporation split to create two highly focused companies serving the distinct needs of customers across diverse industries. The title insurance and settlement services of The First American Corporation became First American Financial Corporation while the property information and analytics businesses became CoreLogic.

The company continued to be commonly referred to as First American and serves homebuyers and sellers, real estate professionals, loan originators and servicers, commercial property professionals, homebuilders, and others involved in residential and commercial property transactions with products and services specific to their businesses. Those services include title insurance and closing/settlement services; property data, and title plant records and images; home warranties; property and casualty insurance; and banking, trust, and advisory services.

In 2019, it was reported that First American Financial leaked hundreds of millions of documents related to mortgages going back to 2003,
In February 2020, First American announced it agreed to buy Docutech, a document, eSign and compliance technology provider, for $350 million.

Products and services

First American serves homebuyers and sellers, real estate professionals, loan originators and services, commercial property professionals, homebuilders, and others involved in residential and commercial property transactions with products and services specific to their needs. First American provides title insurance and closing/settlement services; title plant management services; title and other real property records and images; real estate appraisal services; home warranty products; home insurance; and banking, trust and investment advisory services.

Spin-off
June 1, 2010 marked the separation of the First American Corporation's financial services operations and its information solution businesses into two independent public companies. The spin-off was intended to allow First American to focus solely on its core businesses.

As part of a spin-off transaction, First American Financial Corporation common stock was distributed to shareholders of The First American Corporation on June 1, 2010. The shares of both companies traded on a “when-issued” basis from May 24, 2010 through June 1, 2010, and began full-fledged trading on the New York Stock Exchange on June 2, 2010; First American Financial Corporation under the ticker symbol FAF.

On June 1, 2010, each shareholder received one share of First American Financial Corporation common stock for every share of The First American Corporation common stock held as of the close of business on the record date of May 26, 2010. Shareholders also received a cash payment in lieu of any fractional shares.

Selected subsidiaries and divisions

First American Title Insurance Company
First American Title Insurance Company provides title insurance protection and professional settlement services for homebuyers and sellers, real estate agents, homebuilders and developers, and title agencies titles.

First American Data Tree
First American Data Tree is the US nation's leading providers of public and digital land records and property information, offering a nationwide database of over 6 billion property recorded land documents of 900 plus counties.

FAF International
FAF International is the international division of First American Financial Corporation and is the leading provider of title insurance and a broad range of related property and financial services to both corporate clients and consumers around the world.

First American Trust, FSB
A wholly owned subsidiary of First American Financial Corporation for more than four decades, First American Trust, FSB provides trust and estate administration, trust real estate asset management, investment management, and a range of deposit products and banking solutions to the escrow and real estate industries.  First American Trust is chartered as a Federal savings bank with the Office of Thrift Supervision (OTS).

First American Thrift
First American Thrift is a Federal Deposit Insurance Corporation-insured industrial bank which specializes in loans secured by commercial property in Southern California. The thrift, which has a single branch located in Orange, California, offers a liquid account which pays the current T-bill rate.

First American Property and Casualty Insurance Company
The First American Property & Casualty Insurance Companies offer property and casualty insurance products to home buyers through independent agents and directly through the escrow or closing process

First American Home Warranty
First American Home Warranty is a leading provider of home warranties offering home buyers and home sellers protection against repairs and replacement on their homes’ essential systems and appliances through service provided by a large network of pre-screened and qualified contractors and technicians. Postings on several user critique websites such as Yelp suggest that customers are not satisfied with the insurance provided by First American Home Warranty. For instance on Yelp, with 259 reviews, the company has a one star out of five star rating.

Several lawsuits have been filed against First American Home Warranty Corporation which was named First American Home Buyer's Protection Corporation. When taken as a class action, they have failed. First American argued that if harm is caused, each individual customer is damaged in a different way. In Diaz v. First American Home Buyers Protection Corporation, U.S. District Court, S.D. Cal case no. 09-CV-00775, in their Third Motion to Dismiss at 8, First American objects to a class action on the basis that it would necessitate “tens or hundreds of thousands, of mini trials."

An individual complaint against First American Home Warranty based on inducement into contract and promissory estoppel was filed on May 28, 2020.

First American (India)

 In 1994, First American established First Indian Corporation Private Limited (FIC), to serve as its offshore provider of technology, transaction and analytics services to the Real Estate and Mortgage Industry. First American India had more than 4,000 professionals working out of offices in Bangalore, Hyderabad, and Salem.
 With the spin off of The First American Corporation into First American Financial Corporation and Core Logic Inc., First Indian Corporation also split in two groups as First American (India) for financial services and Core Logic for Information solutions in India.
 In 2011, Core Logic India was acquired by the technology giant Cognizant.
 First American (India) currently has its offices in Hyderabad, Salem and Bangalore, with over 4,000 employees on board. The services offered to its American counterpart includes title insurance processing, software development and testing, technical support, financial services, mortgage servicing and default related services, and legal services.
 In 2013, First American (India) won the NASSCOM award for best emerging companies in the year

External links 
 Official Website
 Company History

References

Companies listed on the New York Stock Exchange
Financial services companies established in 1889
Financial services companies based in California
Companies based in Santa Ana, California
Insurance companies of the United States
1889 establishments in California